Anto Clarke (19 January 1944 – 2 June 2019) was an Irish judoka. He competed in the men's lightweight event at the 1972 Summer Olympics.

References

1944 births
2019 deaths
Irish male judoka
Olympic judoka of Ireland
Judoka at the 1972 Summer Olympics
Place of birth missing
20th-century Irish people